Sarm or SARM may refer to:

 Sarm, Iran
 Sarm East Studios, a recording studio that was located at the southern end of Brick Lane in east London
 Sarm West Studios, a recording studio located in Notting Hill, London
 Selective androgen receptor modulator
 Saskatchewan Association of Rural Municipalities
 Service d'action et de renseignements militaires, military intelligence service of the Democratic Republic of the Congo, succeeded by DEMIAP
 Special Administrative Region of Macau